Events from the year 1752 in Russia

Incumbents
 Monarch – Elizabeth I

Events

  Russia is assumed to have adopted the Gregorian calendar as one of the last countries. See Old Style and New Style dates and cal (command).

Births

 
 
 January 18 
 Alexander Kurakin, Russian diplomat (d. 1818)
 August 11 – Alexander Tormasov, Russian general (d. 1819)
 November 2 
 Andrey Razumovsky, Russian diplomat (d. 1836)

Deaths

References

1752 in Russia
Years of the 18th century in the Russian Empire